Neotrafoiopsis is a genus of parasitic flies in the family Tachinidae.

Species
Neotrafoiopsis andina Townsend, 1931

Distribution
Peru.

References

Diptera of South America
Dexiinae
Tachinidae genera
Monotypic Brachycera genera
Taxa named by Charles Henry Tyler Townsend